Gilles is a 1939 novel by the French writer Pierre Drieu La Rochelle. It follows the life of Gilles Gambier, a Frenchman who is disgusted with the bourgeois world, during World War I and the interwar period. After returning from the war, Gilles marries a Jewish woman for her wealth, becomes involved with the surrealist movement, develops his own fusion of Christianity and fascism, and joins the Nationalist faction to fight in the Spanish Civil War. The novel is partially autobiographical. Drieu La Rochelle himself considered it to be his greatest book.

Reception
The French critic Gaëtan Picon wrote: "Gilles (1939) is, without any doubt, one of the greatest novels of the century—and one of those books in which the disarming sincerity of a man rises to the grandeur usually reserved to literary transpositions."

References

1939 French novels
French autobiographical novels
French-language novels
Novels by Pierre Drieu La Rochelle
Novels set in Paris
Novels set during the Spanish Civil War
Novels set during World War I
Éditions Gallimard books